Naiomi is a female given name. Notable people with the name include:

 Naiomi Cameron, American mathematician
 Naiomi Glasses, American (Diné) textile artist and skateboarder

See also
 Naomi (given name)

Feminine given names